A list of films produced in France in 1941:

See also
 1941 in France

External links
 French films of 1941 at the Internet Movie Database
French films of 1941 at Cinema-francais.fr

1941
Films
French